Mykola Mykolayovych Morozyuk (born 17 January 1988) is a former Ukrainian professional footballer who played as a right-back.

Career

Dynamo Kyiv
In January 2019, he joined Dynamo Kyiv on loan until the end of the season. He has since joined Çaykur Rizespor in 2019.

International goals 

Scores and results list Ukraine's goal tally first.

Honours

Club
Dynamo Kyiv
 Ukrainian Premier League: 2015–16
 Ukrainian Super Cup: 2016

References

External links
 Metalurh Donetsk profile 
 
 

1988 births
Living people
People from Chervonohrad
Ukrainian footballers
Ukraine youth international footballers
Ukraine under-21 international footballers
Ukraine international footballers
Association football midfielders
FC Dynamo Kyiv players
FC Dynamo-2 Kyiv players
FC Dynamo-3 Kyiv players
FC Obolon-Brovar Kyiv players
FC Kryvbas Kryvyi Rih players
FC Metalurh Donetsk players
FC Chornomorets Odesa players
Çaykur Rizespor footballers
Ukrainian Premier League players
Ukrainian First League players
Ukrainian Second League players
Süper Lig players
Ukrainian expatriate footballers
Expatriate footballers in Turkey
Ukrainian expatriate sportspeople in Turkey
Expatriate footballers in Cyprus
Ukrainian expatriate sportspeople in Cyprus